Marziyya Yusuf qizi Davudova, also spelled Marziya Davudova, (8 December 1901 – 6 January 1962) was a Russian-born Soviet Azerbaijan actress who starred in theatre and silent film. She was awarded the People's Artist of the USSR (1949).

Early life and career

Marziyya Davudova was born on 8 December 1901 in Astrakhan, Russian Empire (now Russia), into a family of Astrakhan Tatar origins. She graduated from the Jamiyyat-i Kheyriyya Islamiyya school. In 1917, she debuted as an actress at the local Astrakhan Tatar Drama Theatre. 

In 1918, her talent was noticed by Azerbaijani actor Huseyn Arablinski who was visiting Astrakhan at the time. After the play and a short interview, Arablinski invited Davudova to pursue an acting career in Baku. In 1920, she settled in Baku, Azerbaijan and joined the Arablinski theatre troupe, acting at the Azerbaijan State Academic National Drama Theatre.

Many of her early roles portrayed the government-propagated heroic and independent image of the new-era Soviet woman, as seen in Sevil by Jafar Jabbarly, Hayat by Mirza Ibrahimov, Lyubov Yarovaya by Konstantin Trenyov, etc.

Later life and death 
Throughout her career, she also starred in films such as Bakhtiyar, Haji Gara, Bir aila, Bakinin ishiglari, Bir mahallali iki oghlan, Koroghlu, Asl dost, etc. Her last role was that of the Mother in a theatre play based on Alexis Parnis's Aphrodite's Island in 1961.

She was awarded the following awards the Honored Artist of the Azerbaijan SSR (1933); the People's Artist of the Azerbaijan SSR (1936); the People's Artist of the USSR (1949); and Stalin Prize (or USSR State Prize) of the second degree (1948) for her role in the play "Morning of the East" by E. G. Mammadkhanli.

Davudova died on 6 January 1962 in Baku, aged 60, after a long struggle with cancer.

Personal life
Marziyya Davudova was the partner of actor and director Abbas Mirza Sharifzadeh, who was executed by a Soviet Union firing squad for his political activities and connections. She was the mother of actress Firangiz Sharifova, and great-grandmother of Eurovision Song Contest 2011 winner Eldar Gasimov.

See also
List of People's Artists of the Azerbaijan SSR

References

External links

1901 births
1962 deaths
20th-century Azerbaijani actresses
People from Astrakhan
People from Astrakhan Governorate
Communist Party of the Soviet Union members
People's Artists of the Azerbaijan SSR
People's Artists of the USSR
Stalin Prize winners
Recipients of the Order of the Red Banner of Labour
Azerbaijani people of Tatar descent
Soviet Azerbaijani people
Azerbaijani film actresses
Azerbaijani silent film actresses
Azerbaijani stage actresses
Soviet film actresses
Soviet silent film actresses
Soviet stage actresses
Burials at Alley of Honor